The following lists events that have happened in 1828 in the Sublime State of Persia.

Incumbents
 Monarch: Fat′h-Ali Shah Qajar

Events
 Russo-Persian War (1826–28) finished.
 February 10 – Treaty of Turkmenchay was signed between Persia and Russia.

References

 
Persia
Years of the 19th century in Iran
1820s in Iran
Persia